Raufoss Station is located on the Gjøvik Line at Raufoss in Vestre Toten, Norway. The station was opened on 23 December 1901 as Raufossen, and received its current name on 28 November 1902. It is served by the R30 line by Vy Gjøvikbanen

External links 
 Entry at Jernbaneverket <
 Entry at the Norwegian Railway Club 

Railway stations in Oppland
Railway stations on the Gjøvik Line
Railway stations opened in 1901
1901 establishments in Norway
Vestre Toten